Harold L. Ritchie (born May 24, 1949) is an American Democratic politician, who served as a member of the Louisiana House of Representatives for District 75 from 2004 to 2016. He was term-limited and ineligible to seek a fourth term in the nonpartisan blanket primary held on October 24, 2015.

Ritchie is a funeral director in Bogalusa in Washington Parish in southeastern Louisiana. He graduated in 1967 from Bogalusa High School and attended Louisiana Tech University in Ruston and Mississippi College in Clinton, Mississippi. He graduated in 1971 from Commonwealth College of Science (now called Commonwealth College of Funeral Service).

Ritchie served on the following House committees: (1) Insurance, (2) Ways and Means, (3) Enrollment, and Joint Capital Outlay.

References

1949 births
Living people
People from Bogalusa, Louisiana
Democratic Party members of the Louisiana House of Representatives
American funeral directors
Louisiana Tech University alumni
Mississippi College alumni